Dvortsovy Municipal Okrug is a municipal okrug of Tsentralny District of the federal city of St. Petersburg, Russia. Population:  

The okrug borders Nevsky Avenue in the southwest, the Neva River in the north, and the Fontanka River in the east.

Places of interest include Palace Square, Winter Palace, Hermitage Museum, Church of the Savior on Blood, the Field of Mars, Summer Garden, Marble Palace, Arts Square, and the Palace Embankment.

References

Tsentralny District, Saint Petersburg